Red Rose Tea is a beverage company established by Theodore Harding Estabrooks in 1894 in Saint John, New Brunswick, Canada. Estabrooks began his career in trade imports and exports, and soon moved specifically to the tea trade.  Realizing the inconsistency in loose leaf servings, Estabrooks began packaging his tea leaves into single-serving bags to ensure quality and consistency in every teacup.

Red Rose's older advertisements introduced the catchphrase, "Only in Canada, you say?  Pity..." (The catchphrase was sometimes transformed in Canadian popular culture to, "Only in Canada, eh?  Pity...")  However, as their brand expanded, these slogans became less relevant to their market audience. Instead, they opted for more general slogans such as: "Red Rose Tea is Good Tea." and "A cup'll do you good."

The brand was formerly owned by Brooke Bond Foods of the UK, and is currently owned by Ekaterra in Canada. 
"Red Rose" US brands are owned by Redco Foods, Inc.; since 2018 "Red Rose" tea (USA) has been produced in license by Harris Tea Company.

Tea selection
Red Rose brand tea has been available in the United States since the 1920s, but their Original Blend is a different blend of black pekoe and cut black teas, compared to the orange pekoe sold in Canada.

In addition to their Original Blend, they sell the following products.

Collectible premiums
From the 1950s through the 1970s packages of Red Rose Tea included premiums, including at various times fortune telling tea cups with saucers, for use in tasseography; collectible tea cards; and small ceramic figurines by Wade Ceramics, commonly called Wade whimsies.

Tea cups
There were three white tea cups with gold designs in the series of fortune telling cups, numbered 1, 2, and 3 on the bottom of each cup and saucer. They were manufactured in England by Taylor, Smith, and Taylor of fine bone china. A small illustrated booklet about tea leaf reading accompanied them.

Tea cards
Red Rose collectible tea cards were issued in annual series of 48 cards each, from 1959 through 1975.

Miniature figurines
In 1967, Red Rose Tea began to give away miniature glazed porcelain figures made by the Wade Pottery company of England. The earliest giveaways took place only in Quebec, Canada, as part of a short-term promotion, but the promotion was soon extended to the entire country. During the 1970s, United States test markets for the figurines were opened in Pittsburgh, Pennsylvania and the Pacific Northwest states.

In 1983 the promotion began nationwide in the United States. Different series of figurines were produced for each country, such as the Canadian nursery rhyme characters which were never available in the US. This continued until 1985, when the Canadian series was almost identical to the US series of the same year. According to the company's website, "more than 300 million Wade figurines have been given away in packages of tea in America."

The Red Rose Tea promotion ended in 2018. Remaining figurines from several series are available directly from Red Rose Tea, but they are no longer packaged in boxes of teabags in stores. The primary source has shifted to the antique and resale market.

US Wade Series 
 American Series #1, 1983–1985
 Monkey, Lion, Buffalo, Bush Baby, Owl, Bear Cub, Rabbit, Squirrel, Bird, Otter, Hippo, Seal, Wild Boar, Turtle, Elephant.

 American Series #2, 1985–1994
 Koala, Giraffe, Pine Marten, Langur, Gorilla, Camel, Kangaroo, Tiger, Zebra, Polar Bear, Orangutan, Raccoon, Rhino, Beaver, Leopard, Puppy, Kitten, Rabbit, Pony, Cockatiel. (the last 5 were added in 1990)

 Circus Series, 1994–1999
 Bear, Standing Elephant, Rearing Elephant, Teapot Monkey, Teacup Monkey, Lion, Poodle, Seal, Horse, Tiger, Ringmaster, Human Cannonball, Strongman, Blue Clown, Green Clown. (the last 5 were added in 1996) There was also a circus ring display available separately.

 North American Endangered Animals Series, 1999–2002
 Sturgeon, Manatee, Timber Wolf, Bald Eagle, Florida Panther, Polar Bear, Peregrine Falcon, Green Sea Turtle, Humpback Whale, Spotted Owl.

 Noah's Ark Series, 2002–2006
 Noah & wife (single figure), male and female Elephant, male and female Rhino, male and female Zebra, Goose, Gander, Hen, Rooster, Ram, Ewe, Lion, Lioness. There was also a Noah's Ark display available separately.

 Pet Shop Series, 2006–2008
 Laborador Retriever, Cat, Tropical Fish, Parrot, Kittens, Puppies, Pony, Rabbit, Turtle, Duck. There was also a pet shop display available separately.

 Calendar Series, 2008–2012
 January: Snowman, February: Cupid, March: Leprechaun, April: Easter Bunny, May: Mother's Day Flowers, June: Graduation Cap & Books, July: Uncle Sam, August: Sandcastle, September: Scarecrow, October: Pumpkin Kitty, November: Turkey, December: Christmas Tree.

 Nautical Wonderland, 2012–2015
 Compass, Conch Shell, Crab, Diver's Helmet, Lighthouse, Mermaid, Sail Boat, Gull, Seahorse, Ship's Wheel, Starfish, Treasure Chest.

  American Heritage, 2016–2018
 Arrowhead, Bison, Boston Tea Party Crates, Covered Wagon, Liberty Bell, Space Shuttle, Steam Train, Three Corner Hat, Tractor, White House

The figurines are no longer distributed in either Canada or the United States.  As of summer 2018 the figurines are only available with online orders, per promotional material inserted in the boxes sold in stores in place of the figurines.

TV commercials
The Marquis Chimps appeared in three television commercials for Red Rose Tea in 1960.  One had the apes playing golf, and another showed them as cowboys. The most popular ad, "Rock and Roll Tea Party," featured the chimps as plaid-suited musicians, playing a swinging jazz number at a fictitious "Savoy Ritz" night club in praise of Red Rose Tea. Chimpanzees had been advertising PG Tips (another Brooke Bond brand) since 1956 in the UK, and would continue to do so until the late 1990s.

In 1968, Pittsburgh disc jockeys Zeke Jackson and Frank "Crazy D" DiMino played the "Rock and Roll Dance Party" soundtrack on their radio programs. Listener response was so enthusiastic that they licensed the song from Red Rose's parent company, Brooke Bond Foods, and issued it on a 45-rpm single. Record collector and producer Paul Mawhinney pressed 1000 copies of the tune for Jackson and DiMino on their own Gink label ("Red Rose Tea," Gink #9612, no artist credited); the record version extends the TV-commercial soundtrack by playing it through twice; and the "B" side is identical to the "A" side.

References

External links
 Red Rose Canada site
 US site

Tea brands
Tea companies of Canada
Canadian brands
Ekaterra
Former Unilever brands
Food and drink companies established in 1894
1894 establishments in New Brunswick